Damant is a surname. Notable people with the surname include: 

Andrée Damant, French actress
Derek Damant (died 2021), South African bishop
Guybon Chesney Castell Damant (1881–1963), British navy officer
Nicholas Damant (c. 1531–1616), Dutch magistrate and statesman
Pieter Damant (1530–1609), bishop of Ghent